Kang Eun-bi (born Joo Mi-jin on April 15, 1986) is a South Korean actress. In 2012, she changed her stage name to Song Eun-chae. In 2016, she went back to using the name Kang Eun-bi.

Filmography

Television series

Film

References

1986 births
Living people
South Korean film actresses
South Korean television actresses
AfreecaTV streamers